Rolf Arthur Hansen (23 July 1920 – 26 July 2006) was a Norwegian politician for the Labour Party. He was personal secretary to Minister of Social Affairs 1956–1959, Minister of Defence 1976–1979, and Minister of Environmental Affairs 1979–1981, as well as minister of Nordic cooperation 1980–1981.

References

1920 births
2006 deaths
Ministers of Climate and the Environment of Norway
Defence ministers of Norway